Phyllonorycter geniculella is a moth of the family Gracillariidae. It is found from Sweden to the Pyrenees, Italy and Bulgaria and from Great Britain to southern Russia.

The wingspan is about 8 mm. There are two generations per year with adults on wing in May and again in August.

The larvae feed on sycamore (Acer pseudoplatanus) mining the leaves. The mine starts as an inconspicuous lower surface epidermal corridor. This corridor is followed, and mostly replaced, by a relatively small, lower-surface, tentiform mine with many weak folds. If the mine is located near the leaf margin, the leaf may fold downwards over the mine. The frass is deposited in a corner of the mine. The pupa is formed in the mine and is dark brownish black. It is made in a loosely spun cocoon.

References

External links
 

geniculella
Moths described in 1874
Moths of Europe